A clandestine operation is an intelligence or military operation carried out in such a way that the operation goes unnoticed by the general population or specific enemy forces. 

Until the 1970s, clandestine operations were primarily political in nature, generally aimed at assisting groups or nations favored by the sponsor. Examples include U.S. intelligence involvement with German and Japanese war criminals after World War II. Today these operations are numerous and include technology-related clandestine operations.

The bulk of clandestine operations are related to the gathering of intelligence, typically by both people (clandestine human intelligence) and by hidden sensors. Placement of underwater or land-based communications cable taps, cameras, microphones, traffic sensors, monitors such as sniffers, and similar systems require that the mission go undetected and unsuspected. Clandestine sensors may also be on unmanned underwater vehicles, reconnaissance (spy) satellites (such as Misty), low-observability unmanned aerial vehicles (UAV), or unmanned detectors (as in Operation Igloo White and its successors), or hand-placed by clandestine human operations.

The United States Department of Defense Dictionary of Military and Associated Terms (Joint Publication JP 1-02, dated 8 November 2010, Amended Through 15 February 2016) defines "clandestine", "clandestine intelligence collection", and "clandestine operation" as 

The DOD Dictionary of Military and Associated Terms (January 2021) defines "clandestine" and "clandestine operation" the same way.

The terms clandestine and covert are not synonymous. As noted in the definition (which has been used by the United States and NATO since World War II) in a covert operation the identity of the sponsor is concealed, while in a clandestine operation the operation itself is concealed. Put differently, clandestine means "hidden", where the aim is for the operation to not be noticed at all.  Covert means "deniable", such that if the operation is noticed, it is not attributed to a group. The term stealth refers both to a broad set of tactics aimed at providing and preserving the element of surprise and reducing enemy resistance. It can also be used to describe a set of technologies (stealth technology) to aid in those tactics. While secrecy and stealthiness are often desired in clandestine and covert operations, the terms secret and stealthy are not used to formally describe types of missions. Some operations may have both clandestine and covert aspects, such as the use of concealed remote sensors or human observers to direct artillery attacks and airstrikes. The attack is obviously overt (coming under attack alerts the target that he has been located by the enemy), but the targeting component (the exact method that was used to locate targets) can remain clandestine.

In World War II, targets found through cryptanalysis of radio communication were attacked only if there had been aerial reconnaissance in the area, or, in the case of the shootdown of Admiral Isoroku Yamamoto, where the sighting could be attributed to the Coastwatchers. During the Vietnam War, trucks attacked on the Ho Chi Minh trail were completely unaware of some sensors, such as the airborne Black Crow device that sensed their ignition. They could also have been spotted by a clandestine human patrol. Harassing and interdiction (H&I) or free-fire zone rules can also cause a target to be hit for purely random reasons.

See also
 Black operation
 Covert operation
 Fifth column
 Special Activities Center
 Plausible deniability

References

External links

International Society for Intelligence Research (homepage)
IC21: The Intelligence Community in the 21st Century Staff Study Permanent Select Committee on Intelligence House of Representatives One Hundred Fourth Congress IX. Clandestine Service Executive Summary

Intelligence operations by type
 Clandestine operations